The 2015–16 Saint Mary's Gaels women's basketball team will represent Saint Mary's College of California in the 2015–16 college basketball season. It will be head coach Paul Thomas's tenth season at Saint Mary's. The Gaels, members of the West Coast Conference, play their home games at the McKeon Pavilion. They finished the season 24–8, 14–4 in WCC play to finish in second place. They advanced to the semifinals of the WCC women's basketball tournament where they lost to San Francisco. They were invited to the Women's National Invitation Tournament where they lost to Eastern Michigan in the first round.

Roster

Schedule and results

|-
!colspan=9 style="background:#06315B; color:#D80024;"| Non-conference regular season

|-
!colspan=9 style="background:#06315B; color:#D80024;"| WCC regular season

|-
!colspan=9 style="background:#06315B; color:#D80024;"| WCC Women's Tournament

|-
!colspan=9 style="background:#06315B; color:#D80024;"| WNIT

See also
 2015–16 Saint Mary's Gaels men's basketball team

References

Saint Mary's Gaels women's basketball seasons
Saint Mary's
2016 Women's National Invitation Tournament participants
Saint
Saint